KASA (1540 AM and K294CW 106.7 FM) is a radio station broadcasting a Regional Mexican format. Licensed to Phoenix, Arizona, United States, the station serves the Phoenix area. The station is currently owned by Kasa Radio Hogar, Inc.

History
KASA signed on in 1966, reviving a callsign that had once been assigned to a radio station in Elk City, Oklahoma. It was a religious station, the second in Phoenix behind KHEP at 1280, and was built by Seattle-based Eastside Broadcasting, which also owned four religious radio stations in Washington state.

In April 1980, it built and signed on an FM sister station, KMLE, which broadcast a mix of religious programs and easy-listening music. The station switched from English to Spanish, retaining its religious format, in the mid-1990s.

In 2018, this station relaunched as "La Indiscreta FM" with a Regional Mexican format.

References

External links
 FCC History Cards for KASA

ASA